Nigel Duguid (born 25 November 1969) is a West Indian cricket umpire. He stood in his first Twenty20 International (T20I) match between the West Indies and Ireland on 21 February 2014. He stood in his first One Day International (ODI) match between the West Indies and England on 5 March 2017.

In January 2018, he was named as one of the seventeen on-field umpires for the 2018 Under-19 Cricket World Cup. In January 2020, he was named as one of the sixteen umpires for the 2020 Under-19 Cricket World Cup tournament in South Africa.

Duguid made his debut as an on-field umpire in a Test match on 16 March 2022, for the second Test between the West Indies and England.

See also
 List of Test cricket umpires
 List of One Day International cricket umpires
 List of Twenty20 International cricket umpires

References

1969 births
Living people
West Indian Test cricket umpires
West Indian One Day International cricket umpires
West Indian Twenty20 International cricket umpires
Sportspeople from Georgetown, Guyana
Guyanese cricket umpires